Maude Gabriella Hirst (born February 1988) is an English actress. She is known for her appearances on television in the series The Tudors (2007–2010) and Vikings (2013–2017).

Early life
Hirst was born in Hackney, East London. She is the daughter of producer and writer Michael Hirst and artist Susan Aldworth, and was primarily raised by her mother. Hirst won a scholarship to the Italia Conti Academy of Theatre Arts in London.

Career
Before appearing on screen, Hirst founded the women-centred production company Tuppence Films. She appeared on the British television series The Tudors, created by her father, in the role of Kat Ashley between 2008 and 2010, then starred in  Vikings, also created by her father, for four seasons between 2013 and 2017 as Helga, wife of Floki, played by Gustaf Skarsgård.

In 2017, after Vikings, Hirst decided to step away from acting and changed life direction by devoting her endeavors to the art of Mindfulness.

Filmography

Film

Television

References

External links 
 

Living people
1988 births
21st-century English actresses
Actresses from London
Alumni of the Italia Conti Academy of Theatre Arts
English television actresses
English film actresses
People from Hackney, London
Date of birth missing (living people)